The New England Board of Higher Education (NEBHE) is an interstate compact that was founded in 1955, by six New England governors. NEBHE was approved by New England’s six state legislatures and authorized by the U.S. Congress. NEBHE serves the six New England states: Connecticut, Maine, Massachusetts, New Hampshire, Rhode Island, and Vermont.

History 
1955: NEBHE was established to implement the New England Higher Education Compact and foster cooperation among the region’s colleges and universities.

1957: NEBHE established the New England Regional Student Program (RSP), enabling New England students to pay a lower tuition rate at out-of-state public land-grant universities within New England if they pursue certain academic programs that are not offered by their home state’s public institutions. The RSP would invite community and technical colleges in 1967 and state colleges in 1972, and later transition to the name Tuition Break.

1979: NEBHE created the Commission on Higher Education and the Economy of New England.

1986: NEBHE began publishing its quarterly journal, Connection: New England’s Journal of Higher Education and Economic Development. In 2007, the journal was rebranded as The New England Journal of Higher Education, and in 2010, moved entirely online.

1993: NEBHE created the New England Technical Education Partnership, bringing together educators and industry professionals.

2002: NEBHE initiated a series of three conferences addressing challenges in workforce development, culminating in a policy report titled Building Human Capital: A New England Strategy, which recommends steps to improve science and math teaching in New England schools, expand adult literacy programs and reform community colleges.

2003: NEBHE launched the New England Higher Education Excellence Awards to honor New England individuals and organizations who show exceptional leadership on behalf of higher education, public policy or the advancement of educational opportunity.

2015: NEBHE launched the New England component of the national State Authorization Reciprocity Agreement (SARA). NEBHE now coordinates SARA for all six New England states, as well as New York and New Jersey.

2017: NEBHE launched the Commission on Higher Education & Employability, chaired by Rhode Island Governor Gina Raimondo.

2018: Lumina Foundation awarded NEBHE a grant to launch High Value Credentials for New England (HVCNE) in partnership with Credential Engine. As part of HVCNE, higher education institutions and other credential providers across the region are publishing credentials awarded in four areas (life-/bioscience, health, IT, and business & finance) to the Credential Registry, a cloud-based library that houses, organizes, and links credential information.

See also
National Student Exchange
Midwestern Higher Education Compact
Southern Regional Education Board
Western Interstate Commission for Higher Education

References

External links 
 New England Board of Higher Education Website
 The New England Journal of Higher Education
 NEBHE's RSP Tuition Break

Educational organizations based in the United States
Non-profit organizations based in Boston
Organizations based in Boston
Organizations established in 1955
United States interstate compacts
1955 establishments in Massachusetts